Obligado is a surname. Notable people with the surname include:

Carlos Obligado (1889–1949), Argentinian poet, critic and writer
Clara Obligado (born 1950), Argentine-Spanish writer
Pastor Obligado (1818—1870), Argentine lawyer and lawmaker
Rafael Obligado (1851—1920), Argentine poet and playwright